Marco Capparella (born 28 March 1975 in Rome) is an Italian footballer who plays as a midfielder for L'Aquila Calcio in the Lega Pro Seconda Divisione.

Career 
On 1 July 2011, Capparella signed a contract with L'Aquila for the 2011–12 season.

References

External links 
 

Living people
1975 births
Italian footballers
S.S.D. Varese Calcio players
A.C. Perugia Calcio players
Catania S.S.D. players
U.S. Avellino 1912 players
S.S.C. Napoli players
S.S. Fidelis Andria 1928 players
S.S. Juve Stabia players
L'Aquila Calcio 1927 players
Ascoli Calcio 1898 F.C. players
Serie B players
Association football midfielders